Fake Nudes: Naked is an EP by Canadian rock band Barenaked Ladies. It is the band's fifth EP and their 17th release overall. The EP was released as a digital download only on 30 May 2019 by Vanguard Records.

The EP features acoustic versions of 8 of the 14 tracks original released on Fake Nudes. All tracks were recorded live in the studio without overdubs.

Track listing

Personnel
Jim Creeggan – bass, lead and background vocals
Kevin Hearn – piano, acoustic guitars, lead and background vocals
Ed Robertson – lead and backing vocals, acoustic guitars
Tyler Stewart – drums, percussion, background vocals

References

2019 EPs
Barenaked Ladies EPs
Vanguard Records EPs
Albums produced by Gavin Brown (musician)